The Catholic Diocese of Saint Gallen is a Catholic diocese in St. Gallen, Switzerland. 

The diocese was created in 1824 but united with the episcopal see of Chur until 1847.

Much of the territory had earlier been part of the Diocese of Konstanz.

The St Gallen Cathedral, a UNESCO World Heritage Site, is the see of the diocese.

Ordinaries
Karl Rudolf Graf von Buol-Schauenstein (1824-1833), last Prince- Bishop of Chur
Johann Georg Bossi (1835–1836)
Vacant (1837–1845) 
Johann Peter Mirer (1846–1862) 
Karl Johann Greith (1862–1882) 
Augustin Egger (1882–1906) 
Ferdinand Rüegg (1906–1913) 
Robert Bürkler (1913–1930) 
Alois Scheiwiler (1930–1938) 
Joseph Meile (1938–1957) 
Joseph Hasler (1957–1976) 
Otmar Mäder (1976–1994) 
Ivo Fürer (1995–2005) 
Markus Büchel (2006– )

Roman Catholic dioceses in Switzerland
Diocese (Roman Catholic)
Canton of St. Gallen
1847 establishments in Switzerland
Appenzell Innerrhoden
Appenzell Ausserrhoden